Skruisbreen is a glacier in Sabine Land at Spitsbergen, Svalbard. It has a length of about seven kilometers, and is a branch of Hellefonna. A nearby mountain is Kropotkinfjellet.

References

Glaciers of Spitsbergen